Laura ("Laurien") Eveline Gales-Willemse (born 26 March 1962 in Haarlem, North Holland) is a former Dutch field hockey defender, who won the golden medal with the National Women's Team at the 1984 Summer Olympics. She played club hockey for NMHC Nijmegen and HGC from Wassenaar.

Four years later in Seoul she captured the bronze medal with the national side. From 1981 to 1988 she played a total number of 63 international matches for Holland, in which she scored eleven goals. Willemse retired after the 1988 Summer Olympics in South Korea.

External links
 
 Dutch Hockey Federation

1962 births
Living people
Dutch female field hockey players
Olympic field hockey players of the Netherlands
Field hockey players at the 1984 Summer Olympics
Field hockey players at the 1988 Summer Olympics
Olympic gold medalists for the Netherlands
Olympic bronze medalists for the Netherlands
Sportspeople from Haarlem
Olympic medalists in field hockey

Medalists at the 1988 Summer Olympics
Medalists at the 1984 Summer Olympics
NMHC Nijmegen players
HGC players
20th-century Dutch women
21st-century Dutch women